Eryk Hansel (born 10 June 1941) is a Polish former footballer who played as a defender.

Career 
Hansel began his career at the youth level with Podbeskidzie Bielsko-Biała. In 1962, he played with Walter Rzeszów, and returned to Bielsko-Biała in 1964. The following season in played in the Ekstraklasa with Stal Mielec. In 1967, he was named the team captain, and assisted in securing the league title in 1973. In 1977, he played abroad in the National Soccer League with Toronto Falcons where he assisted in securing two championships. In 1980, he featured in the NSL Cup final against Toronto Italia, but were defeated.

References  
 

Living people
1941 births
Association football defenders
Polish footballers
Podbeskidzie Bielsko-Biała players
Stal Mielec players
Toronto Falcons players
Ekstraklasa players
Canadian National Soccer League players
People from Bielsko-Biała